Thelymitra gregaria, commonly called the clumping sun orchid, is a species of orchid that is endemic to Victoria. It has a single fleshy, channelled leaf and up to six strongly scented, dark blue to purple flowers and often grows in clumps.

Description
The lobe on the top of the anther is yellow with a dark brown or blackish band and a shallow notch. The side lobes are curved with mop-like tufts of white hairs. The flowers are strongly scented and open widely in warm to hot weather. Flowering occurs from September to November.

Taxonomy and naming
Thelymitra gregaria was first formally described in 1988 by David Jones and Mark Clements from a specimen collected near Derrinallum and the description was published in The Orchadian. The specific epithet (gregaria) is a Latin word meaning "pertaining to a flock or herd" or "common".

Distribution and habitat
The clumping sun orchid grows in tussock grassland in southern Victoria.

Conservation
Thelymitra gregaria is listed as "threatened" under the Victorian Flora and Fauna Guarantee Act 1988. The main threats to the species are weed invasion, inappropriate fire regimes and site disturbance. No population of this orchid is in a conservation reserve.

References

External links
 
 

gregaria
Endemic orchids of Australia
Orchids of Victoria (Australia)
Plants described in 1998